The Elmwood Casino, once known as the “Showspot of Canada,” was a popular swanky nightclub situated on Dougall Avenue in Windsor, Ontario. It was located not far from Detroit, just across the Detroit River. (The river divides the metropolitan areas of Detroit and Windsor, an area collectively referred to as Detroit-Windsor. The Ambassador Bridge, the Detroit-Windsor Tunnel and the Michigan Central Railway Tunnel connect the two neighboring cities.) Danny Raskin stated in an article in the The Detroit Jewish News that the Elmwood “was considered a major stomping ground for show biz greats. If you didn't play Al Siegel’s Elmwood Casino, you hadn't hit the big time yet.” Russ Sanders stated in a Windsor Star article, “Name any top notch star and surely that person had either performed there or at least was seen enjoying Al Siegel’s hospitality.” Sanders was a special guest of Al Siegel one night at the Elmwood. He “enjoyed a delicious roast beef dinner and Fiddler on the Roof Starring Topol.” Sanders stated, “I will always remember it as one of the finest shows I have ever seen.”

Music for dancing  and accompaniment for some of the performers at the Elmwood was supplied by The Ambassadors, which was the name of the in-house orchestra that was led by the longtime Elmwood Casino orchestra leader Jack Madden. According to an article in The Windsor Star, trombonist Jack Madden “replaced Glenn Miller in the Ray Noble band in 1938 when it toured the British Isles.” (Miller left Noble’s band to start his own.) Madden, originally from Toronto, married his wife Phyllis and moved to Windsor after World War II was over. At which time, “he became the man behind the music at the Elmwood.” The Windsor Star also stated that “he first came to the Windsor area in 1935 with Rex Battle’s All Canadian Dance Band which was booked  on Bob-Lo Island.” Madden passed away in September 1990, at 77 years of age. Trumpeter Harry Gozzard was a member of the Elmwood Casino orchestra during the latter part of his musical career.

 According to an article written by Windsor Star writer Julie Kotsis, celebrities like Frankie Avalon, Sammy Davis Jr. and Sonny and Cher played golf at the nearby Woodall Golf Centre when they wanted to relax during their time away from performing on stage at the Elmwood Casino.

As reported in the Windsor Star, the Elmwood Casino “opened in the early 1940s and enjoyed a great run for almost 30 years.” Due to serious financial problems, Al Siegel voluntarily filed for bankruptcy. He closed the doors of the historic hometown hangout in December 1974. (Siegel was also one of the founders of Windsor Raceway.)

A Windsor Public Library article mentioned that the Brentwood Recovery Home opened (in 1984) in “the old Elmwood Casino” building. Prior to Brentwood occupying the premises, it “had been closed for years and was in great despair with windows smashed, electrical stripped and entire walls missing.” (Dave Battagello stated in a Windsor Star article that Brentwood is “one of the largest addiction treatment facilities in southwestern Ontario.” He also stated that “Brentwood launched operations in the 1970s in a variety of locations under the leadership of Father Paul Charbonneau.”)

Memorable engagements 

 Sammy Davis Jr. performed at the Elmwood several times during his career. Whenever he did, he would rent out the entire sixth floor at the historic Gotham Hotel, as was mentioned in Earnest H. Borden’s book Detroit’s Paradise Valley. BlackPast mentioned in an article that Davis was on Gotham’s “guest list” of “prominent African Americans.” The Gotham was known as a safe and upscale hotel for African Americans. In her book, The Chosen One, singer Holly Carroll mentioned an interesting incident that she experienced while attending a Sammy Davis Jr. show at the Elmwood in 1972. She stated that “I still have the piece of chocolate that he threw to me after singing his hit song at that time, The Candy Man.” Ironically, it rose the top of the Billboard charts the very day that Sammy Davis Jr. was performing and singing that song at the “Detroit-Windsor” Elmwood Casino. According to an article in MOJO, the last hit Sammy Davis Jr. ever had was the song Hello Detroit.

Young comedian Bob Newhart’s act didn't go over very well during a one-week engagement at the Elmwood. He stated in a Mister Kelly's interview in 2017 that he “‘never got a laugh.’” Even though his comedic performances didn't bring the house down, Newhart still managed to speak well of the Elmwood audiences, stating, “They were very polite...Canadians...very nice.” In David Steinberg's book, Inside Comedy, Newhart stated that poor performance at the Elmwood “‘almost drove me back to accounting.’” Shortly after the Elmwood engagement, he had another gig in Winnipeg that “went well.” That ray of hope persuaded him to “‘stay in the business.’”

 On April 15, 2019, Cher made a surprise appearance on The Tonight Show Starring Jimmy Fallon. Her primary reason for doing so was “to promote The Cher Show, a Broadway musical about her life and career,” stated Dan Savoie in a 519magazine article. During the impromptu interview, Jimmy Fallon asked Cher if there were any parts of her career that she disliked. Cher immediately replied with a rousing response, stating, “Yeah, umm, yeah...!” She then proceeded to talk a few moments about the tough time that she and Sonny were going through back in the late 1960s. Cher stated that “Sonny and I were really famous and our career just went off a hill. We had no money and we had no job and we owed the government $278,000. We just got in a car and headed towards Windsor, Ontario and started our life again.” They went to Windsor due to the fact that they were booked for a three-week engagement (September 1969) at the Elmwood Casino. Since they “were broke-ass broke,” Sonny and Cher “stayed in a seedy motel eating in their room.” A defining moment happened during that engagement at the Elmwood that started to turn things around for them. Savoie stated that “they slowly developed an act that would change everything.” The “act” was Cher would wear a gown and Bono would wear a tuxedo. Cher stated that, at first, “the people hated us...I finally got so pissed off I turned around – like sometimes you do – and started to make the band laugh. And the band will laugh at anything.” Soon after their Elmwood engagement, they took the new comedic concept to Vegas. It was a success.

 Minsky's Burlesque, “‘a musical revue produced by the famed Harold Minsky,’” performed at the Elmwood many years ago. Jane Briggeman stated in her book, BURLESQUE A Final Tribute: Legends Recipes & Minsky’s Files, that “‘Fifteen of the most beautiful dancers and showgirls around have the stage at the Elmwood Casino starting Thursday, April 26.’”
In an Orlando Sentinel article titled, MEMORIES OF PROM NIGHT(MARES), Jean Patteson mentioned short stories of people who had experienced extraordinarily unusual proms. A prom in particular that was related to a Minsky’s Burlesque performance at the Elmwood Casino was one that a man named Pete Darby, “an Orlando man who graduated from a Michigan high school in 1973, experienced. According to Patteson, “Pete Darby’s prom started out fine — but it's  ending was X-rated.” “‘Our parents had arranged a surprise after-prom party at the Elmwood Casino,’” Darby stated. Well, when they arrived to the nightclub, Sammy Davis Jr., who was scheduled to perform that night, “‘had canceled.’” Minsky’s Burlesque revue performed instead, which was a dramatically different performance than a Sammy Davis Jr. one. “The misadventure was reported in Darby’s  hometown newspaper the next day,” stated Patteson. The story was appropriately headlined, “‘It's bumps, grinds for prom party.’”

Notable performers 

Recognized as one of the top entertainment venues in the world at the time, many of the “who's who” of  singers, musicians, comedians, actors and actresses performed at the Elmwood.

Paul Anka
Frankie Avalon
Tony Bennett
Milton Berle
Victor Borge
Carl Brisson
Sid Caesar
Ray Charles
Xavier Cugat
Billy Daniels
Sammy Davis Jr.
Yvonne DeCarlo
Billy DeWolfe
Phyllis Diller
Tommy Dorsey
Jimmy Durante
Nelson Eddy
Ella Fitzgerald
Phil Foster
Buddy Hackett
Juanita Hall
Harmonicats
Hildegarde
Engelbert Humperdinck
Tom Jones
Beatrice Kay
Jackie Kannon
Jane Kean
Frances Langford
Lecuona Cuban Boys
Jerry Lester
Buddy Lester
Sam Levinson
Joe E. Lewis
Robert Q. Lewis
Ted Lewis
Liberace
Dorothy Loudon
Ann-Margret
Marion Marlowe
James Melton
Olivette Miller
Mills Brothers
Liza Minnelli
Wayne Newton
Olsen & Johnson
Patti Page
Janis Paige
Tony Pastor
Eddie Peabody
Dorothy Shay
Dick Shawn
Roberta Sherwood
Frank Sinatra
Sonny and Cher
Ink Spots
The Supremes
Kay Starr
Larry Storch
Barbra Streisand
Sophie Tucker
Rudy Vallée
Nancy Wilson
Frankie Yankovic

References 

Defunct nightclubs in the United States
Former music venues in the United States

External links